1950 in professional wrestling describes the year's events in the world of professional wrestling.

List of notable promotions 
Only one promotion held notable shows in 1950.

Calendar of notable shows

Championship changes

EMLL

NWA

Debuts
Debut date uncertain:
Bob Geigel
Bob Orton Sr.
Dick the Bruiser
Don Curtis
Don Kent
Hard Boiled Haggerty
Karloff Lagarde
Lenny Montana
Little Beaver
Lord Alfred Hayes
Médico Asesino
Missouri Mauler
Rayo de Jalisco Sr.
March 21  Leo Nomellini
April 4  Iron Mike DiBiase
August 3  Don Leo Jonathan
September 14  Pat O'Connor

Births
Date of birth uncertain:
Mike George 
January 5  Bobby Kay(died in 2020) 
January 13  Bruce Hart
January 18  Kahoz
February 2
Osamu Kido
Genichiro Tenryu
March 20 - Al Madril 
May 2 
Moondog Rex(died in 2019)
Don Kernodle (died in 2021)
May 29  Kamala(died in 2020)
May 31  Moondog Spike (died in 2013) 
June 2  Ron Mikolajczyk 
June 7  Howard Finkel(died in 2020)
June 11  King Parsons 
June 13  Chris Taylor(died in 1979) 
June 28  Villano I (died in 2001)
July 10  Shota Chochishvili (died in 2009)
July 14  Hercules Ayala(died in 2020) 
August 1  Jimmy Golden
August 5  Goldie Rogers (died in 2012) 
August 25  Jesse Hernandez
August 28  Cowboy Lang (died in 2007)
September 10  Vivian St. John (died in 2013) 
October 10  Gene Ligon
November 10  Bob Orton Jr.
November 16  Harvey Martin (died in 2001)
November 27  Gran Hamada
November 30  Leroy Brown(died in 1988) 
December 13  Steve Travis (died in 2018) 
December 18  Lizmark (died in 2015)

Deaths
August 25  Earl Caddock (62)
November 4  Danno O'Mahony (38)

References

 
professional wrestling